Serra-di-Fiumorbo is a commune in the Haute-Corse department of France on the island of Corsica.

The Aglia runs through the commune from west to east, to join the Abatesco, which defines the northern boundary of the commune.

Population

See also
Communes of the Haute-Corse department

References

Communes of Haute-Corse